The Myrmidon-class destroyer was a class of two destroyers that served with the Royal Navy.  and  were built by Palmers Shipbuilding and Iron Company as part of the group of boats known as the 'thirty knotters'.

The boats were not able to make this speed in bad weather, where they were usually wet and uncomfortable with cramped crew quarters, but they proved their toughness in serving in the Great War, despite being twenty years old. Thanks to their watertight bulkheads, their thin plating and light structure was able to take a great deal of damage and remain afloat, although their plates buckled easily affecting their handling. Myrmidon was sunk after a collision in 1917, while Syren served through the war and was broken up after the end of hostilities.

They were armed with the standard 12-pounder gun and two torpedo tubes and carried a complement of 63 officers and men. Ships of this type bore four funnels and were designated s after a reorganisation in 1913. These particular ships had a special form of funnel cap fitted which was designed to prevent sea water entering the space between the funnel uptake and outer casing.

Ships
 , launched 26 May 1900, rammed and sunk by SS Hambourn in the English Channel, 26 March 1917.
 , launched 20 December 1900, sold for breaking up 14 September 1920.

Bibliography

 

 

Destroyer classes
 
Ship classes of the Royal Navy